Michael William Frederick MacKenzie (born 18 November 1958) is a Scottish politician. He is a former Scottish National Party (SNP) Member of the Scottish Parliament (MSP) for the Highlands and Islands region from 2011 to 2016.

Early life
Mackenzie was born on 18 November 1958 in Oban. He was educated at Allan Glen's School.

Personal life
MacKenzie and his family live on the small slate island of Easdale which is home to around 60 people. MacKenzie is married to Lynn, a teacher, and in 2012 the two became grandparents to their son Michael MacKenzie Junior's son Archie.

Political career

Mike MacKenzie was elected on behalf of the Scottish National Party as a Member of the Scottish Parliamentfor Highlands and Islands in May 2011.

He was unsuccessful in being re-elected during the 2016 Scottish Parliament election.

In June 2021 he defected from the SNP to the Alba Party.

Controversies
In May 2011, MacKenzie was chastised by a sheriff for going to a "pre-induction" meeting for new SNP MSPs instead of appearing in court to face allegations that he has failed to pay a £4,000 electricians bill while director of Mike MacKenzie builders. In July 2011, MacKenzie lost the court case.

References

External links 
 

1958 births
Living people
People from Argyll and Bute
People from Oban
People educated at Allan Glen's School
Alumni of the University of Glasgow
Scottish National Party MSPs
Members of the Scottish Parliament 2011–2016
Easdale